Ronald Susilo (born 6 June 1979) is a Singaporean former badminton player. Susilo was ranked sixth, his highest ranking, in 2004.

Susilo started his badminton career at age 19 and had represented Singapore since 2002. He had represented Singapore in two Olympics, the 2004 and the 2008 Summer Olympics and was the flag-bearer for Singapore at the 2004 Summer Olympics opening ceremony.

He retired in 2010 before coming out of retirement in 2014 to participate in the 2015 Southeast Asian Games.

Early life 
Susilo studied at the Anglo-Chinese School (Independent) located in Dover, Singapore for his secondary education under a scholarship. He joined the Singapore Badminton Association (SBA) at the age of 19. He is of Chinese Indonesian descent.

Career 
At the 2002 Commonwealth Games, Susilo won the silver medal at the mixed team event.

He won the bronze medals in both the men’s team and singles at the 2003 Southeast Asian Games.

Susilo reached the final four at the All-England Open in 2004 before clinching the Japan Open title.

At the 2004 Summer Olympics, Susilo defeated number 1 seed Lin Dan of China and Björn Joppien of Germany in the first two rounds. In the quarterfinals, Susilo was defeated by Boonsak Ponsana of Thailand 15–10, 15–1.

He was ranked sixth, his highest ranking, in 2004.

In 2004 and 2007, he won the Singaporean National Badminton Championships.

Susilo represented Singapore at the 2008 Summer Olympics, where he lost to number 2 seed Lee Chong Wei of Malaysia 13–21, 14–21 in the men's singles round of 32.

Susilo also won the silver medal for the men's team event in the 2007 Southeast Asian Games and the bronze medal for the men's team event in the 2009 Southeast Asian Games.

A series of injuries and operations to his shoulder, Achilles heel and elbow from 2004 to 2007 saw Susilo retiring from the sport in 2010, ending a 12-year career.

Despite the retirement, he had participated in the men’s doubles at the 2010 & 2012 Li-Ning Singapore Open with brother-in-law Candra Wijaya, the Li-Ning Singapore International Series 2013 with other brother-in-law Hendra Wijaya and winning the Pilot Pen National Age Group Singles in March 2014.

In May 2014, Susilo announced his comeback on the badminton courts, aiming to rejoin the Singapore Team for the 2015 Southeast Asian Games which was held in Singapore. In April 2015, he suffered a muscle tear in his hip and pulled out of the squad for the SEA games.

Susilo had also participated in the Singapore International Series 2014, Vietnam GP Open 2014, Indonesian Masters 2014, Malaysia Kuching International Challenge 2014, Macau Open 2014 & Singapore International Series 2015 since his comeback, with a best result reaching the semi-finals in Malaysia till now.

Personal life 
Susilo first met Li Jiawei in 2002 at a sports meet. They began dating after participating together in the Athens Olympics, and the "golden sports couple", as they were dubbed by the media, announced their engagement in September 2004. They divorced in 2008.

Awards 
Susilo received the 2003 Meritorious Award from the Singapore National Olympic Committee.

Susilo was awarded the Singapore's Sportsman of the Year award in 2005.

Achievements

References

External links 
 
 
 Ronald Susilo at BadmintonEurope.com
 
 
 

1979 births
Living people
People from Kediri (city)
Indonesian people of Chinese descent
Indonesian male badminton players
Indonesian emigrants to Singapore
Singaporean people of Chinese descent
Naturalised citizens of Singapore
Singaporean male badminton players
Anglo-Chinese School alumni
Badminton players at the 2004 Summer Olympics
Badminton players at the 2008 Summer Olympics
Olympic badminton players of Singapore
Badminton players at the 2002 Asian Games
Badminton players at the 2006 Asian Games
Asian Games competitors for Singapore
Badminton players at the 2002 Commonwealth Games
Badminton players at the 2006 Commonwealth Games
Commonwealth Games silver medallists for Singapore
Commonwealth Games medallists in badminton
Competitors at the 2003 Southeast Asian Games
Competitors at the 2007 Southeast Asian Games
Competitors at the 2009 Southeast Asian Games
Southeast Asian Games silver medalists for Singapore
Southeast Asian Games bronze medalists for Singapore
Southeast Asian Games medalists in badminton
Medallists at the 2002 Commonwealth Games